Kidon ("bayonet", "javelin" or a "spear") is the elite unit within Israel's Mossad that is allegedly responsible for the planning and execution of clandestine assassination campaigns against enemies of the Israeli state.

Unconfirmed claims
Kidon is described by journalist Yaakov Katz as "an elite group of expert assassins who operate under the Caesarea branch of the espionage organization. Not much is known about this mysterious unit, details of which are some of the most closely guarded secrets in the Israeli intelligence community." The unit only recruits among former soldiers from the elite IDF special forces units.

According to Israeli author Aaron Klein, Kidon was known as Caesarea until a reorganization in the mid-1970s. Today it is considered a unit within the Caesarea department of the Mossad.

It has been claimed the unit was involved in the Operation Wrath of God campaign. It also has been claimed Kidon was responsible for the assassination of Muhammad Suleiman. Given the secret nature of the unit, there is almost no reliable information available.

In addition to counter-terrorist operations, the Kidon unit can also operate in other capacities in order to assist the needs of the Mossad.

In popular culture
All of Daniel Silva's "Gabriel Allon" novels reference this group.

Kidon is referenced numerous times in the 2001 novel Separation of Power by Vince Flynn as assassins working for the Israeli Mossad.

Kidon is referenced several times in the show NCIS. Kidon is referred to in the NCIS season 6 episode "Legend (Part 2)" when they suspect a Mossad agent visiting the US is part of the Kidon group. In the last episode of the same season, "Aliyah", Ziva David's boyfriend Michael Rivkin is stated to have been a Kidon member. Ziva is shown to be a part of Kidon as well. The director of Mossad, Eli David, Ziva's father, has referred to his daughter as the "sharp end of the spear".

Kidon is also referred to in the Covert Affairs season 1 episode "No Quarter". The protagonist Annie Walker is forced to cooperate with ex-Kidon-turned-Mossad-agent Eyal Lavin when an intelligence exchange in Switzerland is compromised.

In the 2012 Chris Ryan novel Killing for the Company SAS operatives Chet Freeman and Luke Mercer come head-to-head with a Kidon operative gone rogue.

In season 2 of the Israeli TV drama Hatufim, a Kidon operative figures heavily in a plot to assassinate a terrorist leader in Syria.

On October 10, 2013, the comedic film Kidon was released starring Tomer Sisley, Kev Adams, and Bar Refaeli, and written and directed by Emmanuel Naccache. The movie features the assassination of Mahmoud al-Mabhouh as told from the perspective of the Mossad.

John Grisham features the Kidon in his novel The Broker as a specialized team of Mossad assassins out to kill the novel's protagonist "Marco".
 
Kidon is referenced numerous times in the 2013 novel The Enemy, by Tom Wood.

Episode 1, "The Empty Chair" of the BBC2/SundanceTV 2014 political thriller, The Honourable Woman mentions the Kidon when the character Sir Hugh Haden-Hoyle, fictional head of MI6's Middle East desk, is asking who may have assassinated a prominent Palestinian businessman.

Kidon is referenced in Book 6 Our Sacred Honor of the Luke Stone series by author Jack Mars.

See also
 Duvdevan UnitIsrael's undercover strike unit
 Israeli targeted killings
 AmanIsrael's military intelligence agency
 Selective assassination 
 Shin BetIsrael's homeland security/counter intelligence agency
 Special Activities Divisiona CIA organization
 Special Group (India)
 Action DivisionPart of French DGSE

Notes

References
 Frattini, Eric. Mossad, los verdugos del Kidon. Madrid: Atanor Ediciones, 2011. .
 Ostrovsky, Victor. By Way of Deception: The Making and Unmaking of a Mossad Officer. New York: St. Martin's Press, 1990. .
 Thomas, Gordon. Robert Maxwell, Israel's Superspy: The Life and Murder of a Media Mogul. New York: Carroll & Graf Publishers, 2002. .

Mossad
Non-military counterterrorist organizations